Admaston railway station was a railway station serving the village of Admaston in Shropshire, England. It was located on what is now known as the Shrewsbury to Wolverhampton Line.

History

The station was opened by the Shrewsbury and Birmingham Railway in 1849, and was shared with the Shropshire Union Railways and Canal Company. The line through the station was taken over by the London and North Western Railway.  It initially closed to traffic just a few months after opening, but reopened again in the summer of 1850.  It only appeared in LNWR timetables for their Shrewsbury to Stafford route in its early years, as Great Western Railway trains between Shrewsbury and Wolverhampton ran through without stopping there, though the line had come under joint ownership by 1854.  Platforms, a station house and a brick single storey ticket office on the down (westbound) side were eventually provided in the final years of the nineteenth century, by which time GWR trains were calling on a regular basis (though not particularly frequently - the 1895 timetable had three trains to Birmingham and two to Stafford operated by the respective companies, whilst six trains called in the other direction).  After the 1923 Grouping, joint operation passed to the London, Midland and Scottish Railway and GWR.  The station remained quite modestly served thereafter (eight eastbound and seven westbound calls by 1947), though the line itself carried heavy volumes of freight and passenger traffic.

The line then passed on to the Western Region of British Railways on nationalisation in 1948, with Admaston becoming an unstaffed halt at the end of June 1952.

In January 1963, the line and station were transferred from the Western Region of British Railways to the London Midland Region.  Shortly afterwards consent to closure was granted by the then Transport Secretary Ernest Marples the following May.  The last train called here on the evening of 5 September 1964, with closure to passengers coming into effect two days later.

The site today

Trains on the Shrewsbury to Wolverhampton Line pass the site. There is little sign now that the station was ever there (all that remains is the privately owned station house some way back from the line, plus a short piece of retaining wall on the eastbound side), although a feasibility study was undertaken regarding the possibility of reopening in 2003.

Notes

References

Further reading

External links
 Station on navigable O.S. map

Disused railway stations in Shropshire
Former Shrewsbury and Wellington Joint Railway stations
Railway stations in Great Britain opened in 1849
Railway stations in Great Britain closed in 1964
1849 establishments in England